ACHL may refer to:

Atlantic Coast Hockey League (1981–87)
Atlantic Coast Hockey League (2002–03)
Appellate Committee of the House of Lords in the UK; see Judicial functions of the House of Lords

Disambiguation pages